Religare Enterprises Limited (REL) is an Indian investment and financial services holding company, headquartered in New Delhi. REL is listed on National Stock Exchange of India and Bombay Stock Exchange. It is  registered with the Reserve Bank of India (RBI).

History 
Founded in 1982, initially Religare was a stock brokerage firm called Religare Securities Limited (RSL) and was admitted to the National Stock Exchange (NSE) in 1994. In 2000, it secured membership of the Futures and Options segment of the NSE and also registered with National Securities Depository Limited (NSDL) as a depository participant.

Religare Finvest, a group company, was founded in 2001 as a private non-banking financial institution. In 2002, RSL received registration as ‘Portfolio Manager’ from Securities and Exchange Board of India (SEBI). RSL registered with Central Depository Services Limited (CDSL) as a depository participant in 2003. It also became a stock broker at the Bombay Stock Exchange (BSE) in 2004. In the same year, Religare Commodities Limited, a commodities broking company, started operations as a ‘trading cum clearing member’ at both the Multi Commodity Exchange (MCX) and the National Commodity and Derivatives Exchange (NCDEX).

An office was established in London in 2006. In 2006, RSL received registration as Merchant Banker in Category – I from SEBI. Religare announced a joint venture with Macquarie Bank Ltd. in October 2007 to expand its wealth management business. REL went public with an initial public offering (IPO) of its stock in November, 2007, which was oversubscribed 159 times. The same year, RSL received membership of derivative segment of the BSE as trading-cum-clearing member.

In 2008, Religare started a joint-venture life assurance business with Aegon N.V. and Bennett, Coleman & Company called Aegon Religare Life Insurance Company. Religare exited the joint venture in 2015 by selling its stake to Bennett, Coleman & Company.

In 2011, Religare Finvest successfully issued non-convertible debentures (NCDs) worth ₹800 crores. In December 2011, Avigo Capital and in January 2012, Jacob Ballas invest in Religare Finvest Limited (RFL). In 2012 International Finance Corporation (IFC), an arm of World Bank Group, invested in Religare. Religare Health Insurance Company Limited (RHIC) started operations in 2012. Union Bank of India and Corporation Bank tie up with Religare Health Insurance. In 2013 Religare bought Macquarie's stake in the wealth management business. In the same year the name of Religare Mutual Fund was changed to Religare Invesco Mutual Fund. In 2014 Religare announced acquiring a 26% stake in YourNest Angel Fund through its Global Asset Management arm (RGAM).
Religare has exited its global asset management business. In February 2017, Anand Rathi Wealth Management acquired Religare's wealth management business. In April 2017, Religare announced that it had sold its stake to the True North a consortium of PE investors.

Subsidiaries 
 Religare Finvest Limited (RFL)
 Religare Housing Development Corporation Finance Limited (RHDFCL)
 Care Health Insurance (70%)

References

External links
 Official website
 Religare on The Economic Times

Financial services companies based in Delhi
Companies based in New Delhi
Indian companies established in 1982
Brokerage firms
1982 establishments in Delhi
Companies listed on the National Stock Exchange of India
Companies listed on the Bombay Stock Exchange